Michele Niggeler (born 10 March 1992) is a Swiss épée fencer. He has dual nationality, Swiss and Italian, but he competed in the Épée for Switzerland. His club is Lugano Scherma.

He participated at the 2019 World Fencing Championships, winning a medal. He also competed in the 2020 Summer Olympics in Tokyo, but was defeated in the first round.

References

External links

1992 births
Living people
Swiss male épée fencers
World Fencing Championships medalists
Fencers at the 2015 European Games
European Games competitors for Switzerland
Competitors at the 2017 Summer Universiade
Fencers at the 2020 Summer Olympics
Olympic fencers of Switzerland
21st-century Swiss people